Women Ah Run Tings was an all-female dancehall/reggae/R&B/hip hop Canadian group that existed from 1993 through to at least 2002. Nominated for a Canadian Reggae Award three times, the group was founded by Lady Luscious (Jannett Scott-Jones). 

La Bomba, a rapper, said "It was the first time I had met a bunch of females who thought it was cool to rock walls and play music."

Members
At various, and sometimes overlapping, times:
 MC Luscious 
 Tini
 Derek Graham, guitar 
 La Bomba, rapper 
 Paula Gonzalez 
 Mick the Specialist, bass  
 Angel, vocals
 Rexx, rapper

References

External links
 Music video for "MC Flava", 1997

Canadian girl groups
Canadian hip hop groups
Canadian contemporary R&B musical groups
Canadian reggae musical groups
Black Canadian musical groups
Women hip hop groups
Reggae fusion groups
Musical groups established in 1993
Musical groups disestablished in 2002